Chan Sui Ki (La Salle) College (Traditional Chinese: 陳瑞祺(喇沙)書院); also referred to by its acronym CSKLSC is a private, Catholic, Anglo-Chinese boys' secondary school in Ho Man Tin, Kowloon, Hong Kong. It was established by the Christian Brothers, a Roman Catholic religious teaching order in 1969.

History
In April 1967, the Chan family approached the Jesuits to ask if they would be interested in taking over the running of a secondary school and in moving to the new building which they intended to build in memory of their father, Mr. Chan Sui Ki, a successful merchant and once the President of the Tung Wah Group of Hospitals, a well-known charitable organization in Hong Kong. Not inclined to accept the offer themselves, Fr. Cronin, SJ, the Jesuit Provincial Superior, proposed that the offer be made also to the Christian Brothers. Eventually, the Christian Brothers accepted the offer and transferred the existing evening school operating in La Salle College to the new building. The evening school under the supervision of Brother Herman Fenton, FSC operated from 3:00 p.m. until about 8:00 p.m. The government provided the site and an 80% subsidy. The Chan family would donate HK$500,000.

In December 1968, work began on the site. In April 1969 the foundation stone was laid by the then Director of Education, Mr. Gregg, and on 3 September the school moved into the classroom block—951 students and 34 teachers all told. All the while work on the school hall and the laboratories, library, geography, art-room, etc. and the Brothers' quarters (which unhappily provide an accommodation for only four) continued until 12 December when the building authority inspected the completed building in preparation for giving the final occupation permit. The official blessing and opening ceremony was performed on 12 February 1970 by Rev. Father Colombo P.P. and the Hon. J. Canning, Director of Education, respectively.

The community was inaugurated on 1 July 1969 when Brother Herman Fenton, FSC Director and Brother Eugene Sharkey, FSC were appointed to the new school. Later they were joined by Brothers Curran Cronan, FSC and Paul Hackett, FSC Until the Brothers quarters were ready, the community continued to reside in La Salle College.

Dedication
The school was named by the descendants of Mr. Chan Sui Ki after him. The Chan family had  put up more than twenty free schools in Hong Kong and Macau, Canton, Foshan and elsewhere in memory of their father, Chan Sui Ki.

In 1936, Chan received the "Golden Dragon" medal from the Vietnamese Government in recognition of the help he had given during their troublesome times. On several occasions he sent donations to Northern China, Canton and Hong Kong and for years, he distributed free rice to the needy of Macau.

Supervisors

Principals

Cheering songs and slogans 
"Try our best"
Try our best! No regrets!
We are fighting for the glory!
All the boys in red with the Spirits!
CSK gains victory!
"Go Go Win The Race"
Go Go Win The Race! Run Run Run for C.S.K.!

"Go ahead"
Go ahead, show your talent, do your best.
"CSK"
We are from C.S.K!

"Sports Song" 
Cheer cheer for our own school
Wake up the echoes, cheering her name
Send forth a volley of shouts on high
Bring down the thunder from out the sky
What though the odds be great or small
CSK will win over all 
While her loyal sons go marching
Onward to victory
Rah Rah Rah

List of Head Prefects and Student Association's Presidents in the Past

Notable alumni 

Arts, Media and Culture
Albert Leung, lyricist; writer 	

Government and Public Services
Michael Mak Kwok-fung, former member of Legislative Council (LegCo); founding deputy chairman of the League of Social Democrats
Kevin Leung, Board of Education Director at Douglas County School District RE-1, Douglas County, Colorado, United States

Brothers of the Christian Schools in Hong Kong
De La Salle Christian Brothers
Lasallian Family Hong Kong
La Salle College
St Joseph College
De La Salle Secondary School, N.T
Chong Gene Hang College

See also
 Institute of the Brothers of the Christian Schools
 Lasallian educational institutions
 Education in Hong Kong
 List of schools in Hong Kong
 Chan Sui Ki Perpetual Help College

References

External links 
Chan Sui Ki (La Salle) College
Chan Sui Ki (La Salle) College Parent-Teacher Association
Chan Sui Ki College Old Boys' Association Limited
Chan Sui Ki (La Salle) College Student Association
Chan Sui Ki (La Salle) College Overseas Old Boys Network

Boys' schools in Hong Kong
Secondary schools in Hong Kong
Secondary schools in Ho Man Tin
Lasallian schools in Hong Kong
Catholic secondary schools in Hong Kong
Educational institutions established in 1969
1969 establishments in Hong Kong